Bradley "Brad" Beaumont (born March 24, 1992) is a Canadian former soccer player.

Early life and childhood
Born in Scarborough, Ontario, Beaumont lived in Pickering, Ontario until age four, moving to Courtice and attending Courtice Secondary School for four years. While playing for the school, Beaumont won the 2008–09 LOSSA Championship going on to compete in OFSAA. As a child, Beaumont practiced a range of sports, such as hockey and basketball to develop necessitous life skills such as communication. His high school allowed an 'exceptional player clause' for Beaumont due to his talent, promoting him from their junior to senior team.

Professional career
Graduating from St. Bonaventure University in 2014 with a sociology degree, Beaumont got in touch with Trinidadian coach Leslie Fitzpatrick who helped train him and spread his information to clubs in Trinidad and Tobago. Finally, in February 2015, he was signed with fellow Canadian Maleik de Freitas by W Connection F.C. in what Fitzpatrick described as a 'mutually benefiting' transfer with the contract ending by the conclusion of the season. Participating in the 2015 Trinidad and Tobago FA Trophy final, losing 5–4 on penalties, the centre-back stated that the match was the highlight of his career because of the crowd and intensity. He took part in the 2015 CFU Club Championship with his team as well.

Style of play
Described as an intelligent defender, the Canadian was known for his strength in the air and being able to operate in midfield.

References

External links
 ZeroZero profile
 St. Bonaventure Bonnies bio

1992 births
Living people
Soccer players from Toronto
Sportspeople from Scarborough, Toronto
Sportspeople from Clarington
Franco-Ontarian people
Canadian soccer players
Association football defenders
St. Bonaventure Bonnies men's soccer players
Canadian expatriate soccer players
Canadian expatriate sportspeople in Trinidad and Tobago
Expatriate footballers in Trinidad and Tobago
TT Pro League players
W Connection F.C. players
21st-century Canadian people